Mark Gatiss (born 17 October 1966) is an English actor, comedian, screenwriter, director, producer and novelist. His work includes writing for and acting in the television series Doctor Who, Sherlock, Game of Thrones and Dracula. Together with Reece Shearsmith, Steve Pemberton and Jeremy Dyson, he is a member of the comedy team The League of Gentlemen.

Early life and education
Gatiss was born in Sedgefield, County Durham, England, to Winifred Rose (née O'Kane, 1931–2003) and Maurice Gatiss (1931–2021). He grew up opposite the Victorian psychiatric hospital there, and later in Trimdon, before his father, a colliery engineer, took a job as engineer at the School Aycliffe Mental Hospital in Heighington. His family background is working class. His passions included watching Doctor Who and Hammer Horror films on television, reading Sherlock Holmes and H.G. Wells, and collecting fossils. All those interests have influenced his creative work.

One of his early forays into theatre was in Darlington in March 1983, playing Dad, in The Waiting Room by Tony Stowers, a macabre and surreal Pinteresque comedy, which explores a disintegrating family unit. In July of the same year, he would have acted in Stowers' follow-up, A Sense of Insecurity, but was unable to take the role because his father insisted he take his exams instead.

Gatiss attended Heighington Church of England Primary School, and Woodham Comprehensive School in Newton Aycliffe. At the latter, he was two years ahead of Paul Magrs, who also went on to write Doctor Who fiction. Gatiss then studied Theatre Arts at Bretton Hall College, an arts college affiliated to the University of Leeds.

Career

Acting

The League of Gentlemen
Gatiss is a member of the sketch comedy team The League of Gentlemen (along with fellow performers Reece Shearsmith, Steve Pemberton and co-writer Jeremy Dyson). He first met his co-writers and performers at Bretton Hall, Yorkshire, a drama school which he attended after finishing school and having spent a gap year travelling around Europe.

The League of Gentlemen began as a stage act in 1995, which won the Perrier Award at Edinburgh Festival Fringe in 1997. In the same year the show transferred to BBC Radio 4 as On the Town with the League of Gentlemen, and later arrived on television on BBC Two in 1999. The television programme has earned Gatiss and his colleagues a British Academy Television Award, a Royal Television Society Award and the prestigious Golden Rose of Montreux.

In 2005, the film The League of Gentlemen's Apocalypse was released, to generally positive reviews.

Shearsmith and Pemberton reunited in 2009 to create a similarly dark BBC sitcom, Psychoville, which featured an episode guest-starring Gatiss. The three reunited again in 2012 to film a series of sketches for the fourth series of CBBC show Horrible Histories.

Other television work

Outside The League, Gatiss' television work has included writing for the 2001 revival of Randall & Hopkirk and script editing the popular sketch show Little Britain in 2003, making guest appearances in both. In 2001 he guested in Spaced as a villainous government employee modelled on the character of Agent Smith from The Matrix film series. In the same year he appeared in several editions of the documentary series SF:UK. Other acting appearances include the comedy-drama In the Red (BBC Two, 1998), the macabre sitcom Nighty Night (BBC Three, 2003), Agatha Christie's Marple as Ronald Hawes in "The Murder at the Vicarage", a guest appearance in the Vic & Bob series Catterick in 2004 and the live 2005 remake of the classic science fiction serial The Quatermass Experiment. A second series of Nighty Night and the new comedy-drama Funland, the latter co-written by his League cohort Jeremy Dyson, both featured Gatiss and aired on BBC Three in the autumn of 2005. He appeared as Johnnie Cradock, alongside Nighty Night star Julia Davis as Fanny Cradock, in Fear of Fanny on BBC Four in October 2006, and featured as Ratty in a new production of The Wind in the Willows shown on BBC One on 1 January 2007. He wrote and starred in the BBC Four docudrama The Worst Journey in the World, based on the memoir by polar explorer Apsley Cherry-Garrard.

Gatiss has also made three credited appearances in Doctor Who. In 2007, he played Professor Lazarus in "The Lazarus Experiment". In 2011, he returned in the Series 6 episode "The Wedding of River Song" as a character known as Gantok, and in the 2017 Christmas special "Twice Upon A Time" as "The Captain".

Also in 2007, he appeared as Robert Louis Stevenson in Jekyll, a BBC One serial by his fellow Doctor Who scriptwriter Steven Moffat. In 2008, he appeared in Clone as Colonel Black.

In 2010, he portrayed Malcolm McLaren in the BBC drama Worried About the Boy which focused on the life and career of Boy George, and also appeared as Mycroft Holmes in the BBC drama Sherlock, which he co-created with Steven Moffat. He adapted H.G. Wells' The First Men in the Moon into a television film of the same name for the BBC, also playing Professor Cavor. He also made a three-part BBC documentary series entitled A History of Horror, a personal exploration of the history of horror cinema. This was followed on 30 October 2012 with a look at European horror with the documentary Horror Europa.

On 25 December 2013, a version of the ghost story "The Tractate Middoth" by M. R. James and adapted by Gatiss was broadcast on BBC Two as part of the long-running A Ghost Story for Christmas series. It starred Sacha Dhawan, John Castle, Louise Jameson, Una Stubbs, David Ryall, Eleanor Bron, Nick Burns and Roy Barraclough. It was followed on 25 December 2013 by a screening on BBC2 of a new documentary by Gatiss titled M. R. James: Ghost Writer. The programme saw Gatiss explore the work of James and look at how his work still inspires contemporary horror today.

He appeared in season four of Game of Thrones in 2014 playing Tycho Nestoris and reprised this role in season five and season seven.

In the BBC's 2015 series Wolf Hall, Gatiss played King Henry VIII's secretary Stephen Gardiner. He also appeared in Channel 4's Coalition in 2015.

Gatiss appears as the Prince Regent (later George IV) in the eight-part historical fiction television drama series Taboo (2017) first broadcast on BBC One in the United Kingdom on 7 January 2017 and in the United States on FX on 10 January 2017.

He appeared as a modern-day incarnation/descendant of Count Dracula's servile companion Renfield in the series of his own co-creation, Dracula in the third and final episode, "The Dark Compass".

In April 2022, Gatiss starred as Lawrence in the seventh series opener of Inside No. 9.

Radio, stage and film
Gatiss appears frequently in BBC Radio productions, including the science fiction comedy Nebulous and The Further Adventures of Sherlock Holmes story The Shameful Betrayal of Miss Emily Smith. In 2009, he was The Man in Black when BBC Radio 7 revived the character (originally played by Valentine Dyall and Edward de Souza) to introduce a series of five creepy audio dramas. He is also involved with theatre, having penned the play The Teen People in the early 1990s, and appeared in a successful run of the play 'Art' in 2003 at the Whitehall Theatre in London. In film, he has starred in Sex Lives of the Potato Men (2004) and had minor roles in Birthday Girl (2001), Bright Young Things (2003), Match Point (2005) and Starter for 10 (2006). The League of Gentlemen's Apocalypse, a film based on the television series, co-written by and starring Gatiss, was released in June 2005. He also plays the recurring character of Gold in the audio revival of Sapphire and Steel produced by Big Finish Productions. Gatiss also appeared in Edgar Wright's fake trailer for Grindhouse, Don't, a homage to 1970s' Hammer Horrors.

In the 2008 English language re-release of the cult 2006 Norwegian animated film Free Jimmy, Gatiss voiced the character of "Jakki," a heavy-set, bizarrely dressed biker member of the "Lappish Mafia." In this his voice is used along with the other actors of League of Gentlemen such as Steve Pemberton and Reece Shearsmith. The dialogue was written by Simon Pegg and other actors included Pegg himself, Woody Harrelson and David Tennant, who worked with Gatiss on Doctor Who.

He appeared in the stage adaptation of Pedro Almodóvar's All About My Mother at the Old Vic in London from 25 August-24 November 2007. He won much critical acclaim for his portrayal of the transgender character Agrado.

He was scheduled to perform in Darker Shores by Michael Punter, a ghost story for all the family, at Hampstead Theatre 3 December 2009 – 16 January 2010 but had to withdraw after a serious family illness. Tom Goodman-Hill took over his role.

In March 2010, he was a guest on Private Passions, the biographical music discussion programme on BBC Radio 3.

From December 2010 to March 2011, Gatiss was playing the role of Bernard in Alan Ayckbourn's Season's Greetings at the Royal National Theatre in London alongside Catherine Tate.

In December 2011, he appeared in an episode of The Infinite Monkey Cage in an episode entitled The Science of Christmas, alongside Brian Cox, Robin Ince and Richard Dawkins.

In January 2012, he took the role of Brazen in The Recruiting Officer at the Donmar Theatre, London. From 18 October – 24 November that year he was Charles I in the Hampstead Theatre production of 55 Days by Howard Brenton, a play dramatising the military coup that killed a King and forged a Commonwealth under Oliver Cromwell.

In December 2013, Gatiss joined the cast of the Donmar Warehouse production of Coriolanus as Senator of Rome, Menenius. The play went from 6 December 2013 through 13 February 2014. For his performance, Gatiss received a nomination for the Laurence Olivier Award for Best Actor in a Supporting Role.

In May 2017, Gatiss began a recurring role on The Secret History Of Hollywood, a series of podcast biopics on Golden Age-era Hollywood. Its 11-part series, Shadows tells the story of Val Lewton's life and career, with Gatiss providing the introductions for each episode.

In November 2018, Gatiss appeared as the lead in a revival of The Madness of George III at Nottingham Playhouse. The production was broadcast live to cinemas as part of National Theatre Live.

In October 2021, Gatiss wrote and appeared as Jacob Marley in a new adaptation of A Christmas Carol - A Ghost Story by Charles Dickens at the Nottingham Playhouse before transferring to the Alexandra Palace in December 2021.

In May 2022, Gatiss directed The Unfriend, a new play by Steven Moffat at the Minerva Theatre, Chichester, starring Amanda Abbington, Frances Barber and Reece Shearsmith. The play transferred to London's West End Criterion Theatre in January 2023. In February 2023, Gatiss will direct The Way Old Friends Do a new play by Ian Hallard at the Birmingham Rep.

Writing

Doctor Who

At the age of eleven, Gatiss won a school literary competition with a short science fiction story "The Anti-Noise Machine", published in a booklet by Darlington Borough Council. Gatiss had a childhood interest in the BBC science-fiction show Doctor Who and devoted much of his early writing to the series, despite its 1989 cancellation. Gatiss's earliest published work as a professional writer was a sequence of novels in Virgin Publishing's New Adventures series of continuation stories and novels. In these works, he tried to correct the problems which had led to the show's decline in the late 1980s.

The first television scripts Gatiss wrote were for a BBV direct-to-video series called "P.R.O.B.E." Gatiss's four scripts each featured a different actor who had played Doctor Whos titular character of the Doctor: Jon Pertwee, Peter Davison, Colin Baker and Sylvester McCoy. The videos have since been released on DVD despite Gatiss once commenting that he would not authorise their re-release, as he regarded them as a learning exercise.

His other early contributions to the Doctor Who franchise included four novels, two audio plays for BBV and two audio plays for Big Finish Productions.

Gatiss has written nine episodes for the 2005 revival of the show. His first, "The Unquiet Dead," was the third episode of the revived series in 2005; the second, "The Idiot's Lantern," aired the following year in the second series. Although he acted in the third series and proposed an ultimately unproduced episode for the fourth, involving Nazis and the British Museum, it took until 2010 for Gatiss to return as writer. He wrote "Victory of the Daleks" for that year's fifth series and went on to contribute "Night Terrors" for series 6, "Cold War" and "The Crimson Horror" for series 7 and "Robot of Sherwood" for series 8. He also wrote "Sleep No More" for series 9 and "Empress of Mars" for series 10.

He has also contributed to the franchise outside the main show. His early work (see above) was primarily Doctor Who expanded media, and Gatiss wrote and performed in the comedy spoof sketches The Web of Caves, The Kidnappers and The Pitch of Fear for the BBC's "Doctor Who Night" in 1999 with David Walliams.

He penned the 2013 docudrama An Adventure in Space and Time, a drama depicting the origins of the series, to celebrate the show's fiftieth anniversary. It ended with a cameo by Gatiss's League of Gentleman castmate Reece Shearsmith, portraying Patrick Troughton, who played the Second Doctor. A "Making Of" feature about this programme, narrated by Gatiss, was made available on the BBC Red Button service, and also posted on the BBC's official YouTube channel.

He has written for Doctor Who Magazine, including a column written under the pseudonym "Sam Kisgart," which he was originally credited as in the Doctor Who Unbound audio play Sympathy for the Devil for his role as the Master. "Sam Kisgart" is an anagram of "Mark Gatiss", and is also the name under which he was credited for his cameo in Psychoville.

Sherlock
With Steven Moffat, with whom Gatiss worked on Doctor Who and Jekyll, he also co-created and co-produced Sherlock. Premiering in 2010, the series is a modernised adaptation of the Sherlock Holmes stories, in which Gatiss plays the role of Sherlock's brother Mycroft. Gatiss has influence on all episodes as producer and he has written four episodes, one for each series: the finale, "The Great Game," for the first series, "The Hounds of Baskerville" for the second, "The Empty Hearse" for the third and "The Six Thatchers" for the fourth. He also co-wrote "Many Happy Returns," a mini-episode released in late December 2013 which acts as a prelude to the third series, with Steven Moffat; the episode "The Sign of Three" with Moffat and Steve Thompson; and "The Abominable Bride", a special episode released in early January 2016, with Moffat. Finally, he co-wrote the final episode of Sherlock, "The Final Problem", with Moffat, released in January 2017.

Other work as writer
Gatiss has written several non-fiction works, including a biography of the film director James Whale and the documentary M.R. James: Ghost Writer, which Gatiss also presented. The documentary followed Gatiss's directorial debut with an adaption of one of James's stories, "The Tractate Middoth", for BBC Two, which was broadcast on Christmas Day 2013. Gatiss also wrote, co-produced and appeared in Crooked House, a ghost story that was broadcast on BBC Four during Christmas 2008.

His first non-Doctor Who novel, The Vesuvius Club, was published in 2004, for which he was nominated in the category of Best Newcomer in the 2006 British Book Awards. A follow-up, The Devil in Amber, was released on 6 November 2006. It transports the main character, Lucifer Box, from the Edwardian era in the first book to the roaring Twenties/Thirties. A third and final Lucifer Box novel, Black Butterfly, was published on 3 November 2008 by Simon & Schuster.

In 2017, Gatiss and Steven Moffat re-teamed to write three episodes for TV miniseries Dracula. The series premiered on BBC One on 1 January 2020, and was broadcast over three consecutive days. The three episodes were then released on Netflix on 4 January 2020. In June 2021, a new adaptation of The Ghosts by Antonia Barber, written and directed by Gatiss for Sky One, was announced. It broadcast on 24 December.

Personal life
Gatiss is gay and was featured on The Independent on Sundays Pink List of influential gay people in the UK in 2010, 2011 and 2014. He married actor Ian Hallard in 2008 in Middle Temple, in the City of London. Gatiss once built a Victorian era laboratory in his north London home, as the fulfilment of a childhood dream. Gatiss is an atheist. The University of Huddersfield awarded him an honorary doctorate of letters in 2003.

Filmography

Actor

Film

Television

Writer

Director

Bibliography

Books

Doctor Who novels 
 Nightshade
 St Anthony's Fire
 The Roundheads
 Last of the Gaderene (also 2013 reissue )
 The Crimson Horror

Doctor Who anthology contributions 
 Doctor Who: The Shooting Scripts (teleplay "The Unquiet Dead")
 The Doctor Who Storybook 2007 (short story "Cuckoo-Spit")
 The Doctor Who Storybook 2009 (short story "Cold")
 The Doctor Who Storybook 2010 (short story "Scared Stiff")
 The Brilliant Book of Doctor Who 2011 (short fiction The Lost Diaries of Winston Spencer Churchill)
 The Brilliant Book of Doctor Who 2012 (short fiction George's Diary)

The League of Gentlemen 
 A Local Book for Local People
 The League of Gentlemen: Scripts and That
 The League of Gentlemen's Book of Precious Things

Lucifer Box novels 
 The Vesuvius Club
 The Devil in Amber
 Black Butterfly

Miscellaneous non-fiction 
 James Whale: A Biography
 They Came From Outer Space!: Alien Encounters in the Movies (with David Miller)

Miscellaneous fiction 
 The King's Men (as "Christian Fall").
 The EsseX Files: To Basildon and Beyond (with Jeremy Dyson).

Audio plays
  2000 AD (Judge Dredd audio) Death Trap

 Doctor Who (and related) 
 Time Travellers: Republica Time Travellers: Island of Lost Souls Phantasmagoria Invaders from Mars''

References

External links
  
 
 

1966 births
Living people
20th-century English male actors
20th-century English novelists
21st-century English male actors
21st-century English novelists
Actors from County Durham
Alumni of Bretton Hall College
BBC television producers
British male television writers
English atheists
English comedy writers
English film producers
English male comedians
English male film actors
English male novelists
English male radio actors
English male screenwriters
English male stage actors
English male television actors
English male voice actors
English radio writers
English republicans
English science fiction writers
English screenwriters
English television directors
English television producers
English television writers
English gay actors
English gay writers
English LGBT novelists
British LGBT screenwriters
People associated with the University of Huddersfield
People from Heighington, County Durham
People from Sedgefield
The League of Gentlemen
Writers of Doctor Who novels